Westmoreland Central is a parliamentary constituency represented in the House of Representatives of the Jamaican Parliament. It elects one Member of Parliament by the first past the post system of election. The constituency consists of the central part of Westmoreland Parish.

Members

References

Parliamentary constituencies of Jamaica